The Malla dynasty was the ruling dynasty of Kathmandu Valley in Nepal, from the 13th to the 18th century. The Mallas, starting from Aridev Malla in 1201, ruled the Kathmandu Valley and surrounding region which was known as Nepal or Nepal Mandala and the citizens were known as Nepa:mi (in Newari) at that time. In the late 15th century, the Kathmandu Valley was divided into four kingdoms of Bhaktapur (Bhadgaon), Kathmandu (Kantipur), Patan (Lalitpur), and Banepa. The division led to weakening of the dynasty resulted by numerous conflicts among the rulers. 

The Malla dynasty came to an end in 1769 when Prithvi Narayan Shah of Gorkha invaded the valley, thus inaugurating the Shah dynasty of Nepal.

Malla rulers of the Kathmandu valley

Malla rulers of Kantipur (Yei)

Malla rulers of Lalitpur (Yala) 
Purandara Simha c.1580 – 1600
Harihara Simha c.1600 – 1609
Siddhi Narasimha Malla 1620 – 1661
Srinivasa Malla 1661 – 1685
Yoga Narendra Malla 1685–1705
Loka Prakash Malla 1705–1706
Indra Malla (Purandara Malla) 1706–1709
Vira Narasimha Malla 1709
Vira Mahindra Malla 1709–1715
Riddhi Narasimha Malla 1715–1717
Mahindrasimha Malla (King of Kantipur) 1717–1722
Yoga Prakash Malla 1722–1729
Vishnu Malla 1729–1745
Rajya Prakash Malla 1745–1758
Vishvajit Malla 1758–1760
Jaya Prakash Malla (King of Kantipur) 1760–1761, 1763–1764
Ranajit Malla (King of Bhaktapur) 1762–1763
Dal Mardan Shah 1764–1765
Tej Narasimha Malla 1765–1768

Malla rulers of Bhaktapur (Khowpa)
Yaksha Malla 1428–1482
Ratna Malla 1482–1519
Prana Malla 1519–1547
Vishva Malla 1547–1561
Trailokya Malla 1560–1613
Jagajjyoti Malla 1613–1637
Naresha Malla 1637–1644
Jagat Prakasha Malla 1644–1673
Jitamitra Malla 1673–1696
Bhupatindra Malla 1696–1722
Ranajit Malla 1722–1769

References 
 Petech, Luciano. (1984). Mediaeval History of Nepal (ca. 750–1480). 2nd ed. Serie orientale, toma 54. Rome: Institutio Italiano per il Medio ed Estremo Oriente.

Nepal history-related lists
Nepal, Kings